Sonagiri may refer to:
 Sonagiri a place in Gwalior, holy for the Jain community.
 Sonagiri (Bhopal), a locality in Bhopal, Madhya Pradesh.
 Sonagiri, a village in Ratnagiri district, Maharashtra.